St Asaph Cricket Club is a Welsh cricket club based in St Asaph, Denbighshire. The club plays at Elwy Grove Park. The club has played in the North Wales Premier Cricket League Premier Division since 2002, with the exception of the 2009 season, when they played in Division One; they won the league title in 2021 for the first time since 1975. The club operates two senior teams, both of which play in the North Wales league system, as well as three age-group sides.

References

External links
Official site

Welsh club cricket teams
Sport in Denbighshire
1862 establishments in Wales
St Asaph